The following is a list of the 29 cantons of the Bouches-du-Rhône department, in France, following the French canton reorganisation which came into effect in March 2015:

 Aix-en-Provence-1
 Aix-en-Provence-2
 Allauch
 Arles
 Aubagne
 Berre-l'Étang
 Châteaurenard
 La Ciotat
 Gardanne
 Istres
 Marignane
 Marseille-1
 Marseille-2
 Marseille-3
 Marseille-4
 Marseille-5
 Marseille-6
 Marseille-7
 Marseille-8
 Marseille-9
 Marseille-10
 Marseille-11
 Marseille-12
 Martigues
 Pélissanne
 Salon-de-Provence-1
 Salon-de-Provence-2
 Trets
 Vitrolles

References